Susy is a feminine given name, sometimes a short form (hypocorism) of Susan, Susanne, Susannah, etc.

Susy may refer to:

People
 Susy Andersen (born 1940), Italian actress
 Susanne Augustesen (b. 1956), Danish footballer
 Susy Avery (born 1947), American politician
 Olivia Susan Susy Clemens (1872-1896), a daughter of Mark Twain
 Susy Delgado (born 1949), Paraguayan poet and writer
 Isabella Susy De Martini (born 1952), Italian politician and academic
 Susy Dorn, Peruvian teacher and musician born Susana Gabriela Rodriguez Santander in 1974
 Susy Frankel, New Zealand law academic
 Susy Kane (born 1978), English actress and writer
 Susannah Susy Pryde (born 1973), New Zealand cyclist
 Susy Schultz, Chicago journalist and social advocate
 Susy Thunder, hacker Susan Headley (born 1959)
 Susi Wirz (b. 1931), Swiss figure skater

Fictional characters
 Susy Hendrix, blind character played by Audrey Hepburn in Wait Until Dark (film)

See also
 Susie (disambiguation)
 Susi (disambiguation)
 Sussy (disambiguation)
 Suzi (disambiguation)
 Suzie (disambiguation)
 Suzy (disambiguation)

Feminine given names
Hypocorisms